C/2002 T7 (LINEAR) is a comet discovered in 2002 by LINEAR project. The comet brightened to a magnitude of 2.2.

History
The LINEAR project announced the discovery of this object on October 14, 2002. At that time, comet had a magnitude of 17.5. 
Before the end of the month, several observatories obtained follow-up observations. On October 29, IAU Circular No. 8003 announced this object to be a comet. Prediscovery observations were found on LINEAR images from October 12. At the time of discovery the comet was 6.9 AU from the Sun. The comet is considered to be dynamically new object from the Oort Cloud and that was the first time it came closer to Sun than Jupiter.

The comet brightened until mid February 2004, when the comet stayed to a magnitude of 7 until early March, when it entered the twilight and it couldn't be easily observed. It passed from a minimum solar elongation of 9° in late March. The comet was observed again on April 9 in twilight, when it had a magnitude of 4.6. The comet passed its perihelion on April 23 but it continued to brighten as it was approaching Earth. The closest approach was on 19 May 2004, when the comet had an estimated magnitude of 2.5 to 3. The comet was visible in the sky along with the equally bright comet C/2001 Q4 (NEAT).

On 30 April 2004, the comet was imaged and studied using the remote-sensing devices on the Rosetta spacecraft. The coma and tail were measured in wavelengths ranging from the ultraviolet to microwave. This occurred from a distance of about 95 million kilometres. The presence of water molecules around the comet was successfully identified.

References

External links 
 C/2002 T7 (LINEAR) at cometography.com
 IAUC 8003

Non-periodic comets
20021014